Charles Frederick Grieve (1 October 1913 in Manila, Philippines – 1 June 2000 in Ludlow, Shropshire, England) was a Scotland international rugby union player. He was also a notable cricketer for Guernsey and Oxford University. He was born in Manila in the Philippines and was educated at Ampleforth College in England.

Rugby Union career

Amateur career

He played club rugby with Oxford University.

In the first trial match his team was listed as the Duke of Wellington's Regiment.

Provincial career

He was supposed to play for the Scotland Probables in the first trial match of season 1937-38. The match due on 18 December 1937 was called off due to frost despite the contingency of straw being placed on The Greenyards pitch at Melrose. He did however turn out for the Scotland Probables side for the second and final trial match of that season, on 15 January 1938.

International career

Grieve was capped for  against Wales in 1935.

Grieve was also on the 1938 British Lions tour to South Africa.

Cricket career

Grieve was a right-handed batsman. He represented Ampleforth on the 1st XI.

Later progressing to Oxford University, he represented the University cricket club in a single first-class match against Derbyshire in 1936.  In this match he scored 6 runs in the University's first-innings before being dismissed by George Pope and in their second-innings he 2 runs before being dismissed by Tommy Mitchell.  In 1934, he had played his only match for Guernsey against the Marylebone Cricket Club in what was a non first-class fixture.  Opening the batting in Guernsey's first-innings, he scored a century and in their second he scored 6 runs.

References

External links

Charles Grieve at ESPNcricinfo
Charles Grieve at CricketArchive

1913 births
2000 deaths
Aldershot Services rugby union players
People from Manila
People educated at Ampleforth College
Alumni of Christ Church, Oxford
Guernsey cricketers
Oxford University cricketers
Scotland international rugby union players
Scottish rugby union players
British & Irish Lions rugby union players from Scotland
Oxford University RFC players
Sportspeople from Yorkshire
Scotland Probables players
British expatriates in the Philippines
Rugby union fullbacks